Stephen Chance may refer to:

Stephen Chance (actor), British actor who plays Nimrod (Doctor Who)
Philip Turner (writer) used the pseudonym when writing children's mystery novels about the Reverend Septimus Treloar
Stephen Chance, victim of Kamwenge Trading Centre shooting
Steve Chance, fictional character in Cuckoo (TV series)